Plectotropis is a genus of air-breathing land snails, terrestrial pulmonate gastropod mollusks in the family Camaenidae.

Nomenclature 
Plectotropis is a substitute name for Thea Albers, 1850, junior homonym of Thea Mulsant, 1846. Martens designated Helix elegantissima L. Pfeiffer, 1849 as type species, which was not originally included in Thea.

Species
 
 Plectotropis aemula (Gude, 1900)
 Plectotropis akowtongensis (Theobald, 1859)
 Plectotropis albocrenatus (Bavay & Dautzenberg, 1909)
 Plectotropis applanata  (Möllendorff, 1884)
 Plectotropis austeni  Preston, 1915
 Plectotropis barbosella (Heude, 1882)
 Plectotropis biggiei Preston, 1910
 Plectotropis bonnieri (H. Fischer, 1898)
 Plectotropis brevibarbis (L. Pfeiffer, 1859)
 Plectotropis chondroderma Möllendorff, 1900
 Plectotropis conella (A. Adams, 1868)
 Plectotropis conomphala Pilsbry & Y. Hirase, 1903
 Plectotropis couturieri (Bavay & Dautzenberg, 1909)
 Plectotropis dasytricha (Bavay & Dautzenberg, 1909)
 Plectotropis diplogramme Möllendorff, 1902
 Plectotropis elegantissima (L. Pfeiffer, 1849)
 Plectotropis esakii (Kuroda, 1973)
 Plectotropis gerlachi (Martens, 1881)
 Plectotropis hatakedai (Kuroda & Habe, 1951)
 Plectotropis horrida (Pilsbry, 1900)
 Plectotropis hupensis (Gredler, 1885)
 Plectotropis icela Pilsbry, 1934
 Plectotropis inexpectata (Kuroda & Minato, 1977)
 Plectotropis itoi (Kuroda & Azuma, 1982)
 Plectotropis kiusiuensis (Pilsbry, 1900)
 Plectotropis kraepeleni Leschke, 1914
 Plectotropis laciniosula (Heude, 1885)
 Plectotropis lancasteri (Gude, 1919)
 Plectotropis lepidophora (Gude, 1900)
 Plectotropis lithina (Heude, 1885)
 Plectotropis lofouana (Möllendorff, 1888)
 Plectotropis mackensii (Adams & Reeve, 1850)
 Plectotropis marginata (Pilsbry & Y. Hirase, 1903)
 Plectotropis mentaweiense Degner, 1928
 Plectotropis minima Pilsbry, 1934
 Plectotropis nunobikiensis (Ogaito & Sorita, 1981)
 Plectotropis nutans Gude, 1914
 Plectotropis lithina (Heude, 1885)
 Plectotropis lofouana (Möllendorff, 1888)
 Plectotropis omiensis (Pilsbry, 1902)
 Plectotropis osbeckii (Philippi, 1847)
 Plectotropis pannosa (Pilsbry, 1902)
 Plectotropis patungensis (Gredler, 1887)
 Plectotropis pentagonostoma Möllendorff, 1899
 Plectotropis pressa (Pilsbry & Y. Hirase, 1904)
 Plectotropis pseudopatula Möllendorff, 1899
 Plectotropis quelpartensis (Pilsbry & Hirase, 1908)
 Plectotropis repanda (L. Pfeiffer, 1861)
 PLectotropis scepasma (Reeve, 1854)
 Plectotropis scitula (Pilsbry & Y. Hirase, 1908)
 Plectotropis sinkaitzensis Pilsbry, 1934
 Plectotropis squamulifera (Möllendorff, 1887)
 Plectotropis stenomphala Möllendorff, 1899
 Plectotropis sterilis (Heude, 1890)
 Plectotropis subconella (Möllendorff, 1888)
 Plectotropis quelpartensis (Pilsbry & Hirase, 1908)
 Plectotropis repanda (L. Pfeiffer, 1861)
 Plectotropis scepasma (Reeve, 1854)
 Plectotropis tapeina (Benson, 1836)
 Plectotropis trichotropis (L. Pfeiffer, 1850)
 Plectotropis visayana (Möllendorff, 1888)
 Plectotropis vulgivaga (Schmacker & O. Boettger, 1890)
 Plectotropis xydaea (Bavay & Dautzenberg, 1909)
 Plectotropis yonganensis W.-C. Zhou, Q. Xiao, D.-N. Chen & C.-C. Hwang, 2011

Taxa inquerenda
 Plectotropis comata Sturany, 1899
 Plectotropis scabricula (A. Adams, 1868) 
 Plectotropis setocincta (A. Adams, 1868)
Synonyms
 Plectotropis oldhami (Benson, 1859): synonym of Aegista oldhami (Benson, 1859)

References

  Bank, R. A. (2017). Classification of the Recent terrestrial Gastropoda of the World. Last update: July 16, 2017

External links
 Albers, J. C. (1850). Die Heliceen nach natürlicher Verwandtschaft systematisch geordnet. Berlin: Enslin. 262 pp
 Albers, J. C.; Martens, E. von. (1860). Die Heliceen nach natürlicher Verwandtschaft systematisch geordnet von Joh. Christ. Albers. Zweite Ausgabe. I-XVIII, 1-359. Leipzig: Engelman

 
Camaenidae
Gastropod genera